The Letters of Kingsley Amis (2001) was assembled and edited by the American literary critic Zachary Leader. It is a collection of more than 800 letters from Amis to many different friends and professional acquaintances from 1941 until shortly before his death in 1995. About one quarter of the letters selected were addressed to Amis's close friend, the poet Philip Larkin.

The other recipients of letters included in the book include:
Brian Aldiss, novelist
Martin Amis, novelist and Amis's younger son
Philip Amis, Amis's older son
John Betjeman, poet
Robert Conquest, historian and poet
Brian Cox, literary critic
Robert Graves, poet and novelist
Elizabeth Jane Howard, novelist, Amis's second wife 
Anthony Powell, novelist
C.P. Snow, novelist
Anthony Boucher, novelist
Paul Ferris (author)

The publication of the book was concurrent with that of Experience, a memoir by Kingsley Amis's son, the novelist Martin Amis. The author David Lodge called the Letters "a major literary event" and the critic John Carey proclaimed Leader's editing of the letters to be "omniscient".

2001 non-fiction books
Books by Kingsley Amis
HarperCollins books